In 2017, the term sapphire jubilee or blue sapphire jubilee was coined for the celebrations to mark the 65th anniversary of the reign of Queen Elizabeth II (see Sapphire Jubilee of Queen Elizabeth II). Previously, the sapphire wedding anniversary was understood to be the 45th, and this would be expected to carry over to regnal anniversaries as with silver, golden, and diamond jubilees.

65-year reign anniversaries in recent history

See also 

 Hierarchy of precious substances
 List of longest-reigning monarchs
 Wedding anniversary

References 

Anniversaries